Christopher, Jr. is a four act American play, by Madeleine Lucette Ryley.

In June 1895, it tried out in Wilkes-Barre.
It was featured on Broadway on October 7, 1895, at the Empire Theater, and starred Maude Adams.

Bibliography

References

External links
Christopher Junior: comedy in four acts by Madeleine Lucette Ryley

External links
http://www.ibdb.com/production.php?id=13449

Broadway plays
American plays